"Walk Alone" is a song by English drum and bass band Rudimental, featuring vocals from Scottish singer and songwriter Tom Walker. The song was released as a digital download on 26 October 2018, as the fourth single from Rudimental's third studio album, Toast to Our Differences. The song was written by Amir Izadkhah, Piers Aggett, Kesi Dryden, Leon "DJ Locksmith" Rolle, Cass Lowe, Ilsey Juber, Dacoury Natche, Thomas Walker, Jesse Shatkin and Jonathan Mensah. It‘s also included on Walker’s debut album, What a Time to Be Alive.

Music video
A music video to accompany the release of "Walk Alone" was first released onto YouTube on 1 November 2018. Filmed in Auckland, New Zealand, it follows two rugby players who develop a genuine friendship

Track listing

Charts

Weekly charts

Year-end charts

Certifications

Release history

References

 

Songs about loneliness

2018 singles
2018 songs
Rudimental songs
Tom Walker (singer) songs
Song recordings produced by Rudimental
Songs written by Cass Lowe
Songs written by Ilsey Juber
Songs written by DJ Dahi
Songs written by Jesse Shatkin
Sony Music UK singles